The 2010 United States Senate election in Utah took place on November 2, 2010, along with other midterm elections throughout the United States. Incumbent Republican U.S. Senator Bob Bennett was seeking re-election to a fourth term, but lost renomination at the Republican Party's state convention. Mike Lee proceeded to win the Republican primary against Tim Bridgewater and the general election against Democrat Sam Granato. , this is the most recent U.S. Senate election in which a political party held the seat after denying renomination to the incumbent senator.

Process 
The filing period for candidates began March 12, 2010 and ended March 19, 2010. Candidates who had not filed by that date cannot appear on the ballot in November. Eleven candidates filed with the Office of the Lieutenant Governor.

Both the Utah State Democratic Party and the Utah State Republican Party held statewide caucus meetings on March 23, 2010. Caucus meetings are grouped by legislative district and divided by precincts with each precinct electing delegates who attend their respective party's state nominating convention.

The Utah State Democratic and Republican Parties held their conventions on May 8, 2010. At the Republican convention, incumbent Senator Bob Bennett finished third in balloting among delegates and was eliminated from the race. Business owner Tim Bridgewater finished first and attorney Mike Lee finished second, but Bridgewater did not receive enough votes (he needed at least 60 percent) to avoid a primary election runoff against Lee. At the Democratic convention, delegates nominated businessman Sam Granato, who received 77.5 percent of the vote.

In the Republican primary election, held on June 22, 2010, Lee became the Republican nominee by winning 51 percent of the vote against Bridgewater's 49 percent.

The general election was held on November 2, 2010. Lee won the election with 62 percent of the vote to Granato's 33 percent and 6 percent for Constitution Party candidate Scott Bradley.

Republican nomination

Convention

Candidates 
On Ballot
 Bob Bennett, incumbent U.S. Senator
 Tim Bridgewater, businessman and candidate for UT-02 in 2002 and 2004
 David Chiu
 Merrill Cook, former U.S. Representative
 Cherilyn Eagar, businesswoman
 Leonard Fabiano
 Jeremy Friedbaum
 Mike Lee, attorney

Withdrew
 Mark Shurtleff State Attorney General

Endorsements 
The following are endorsements made before the convention

Bennett

Lee

Polling

Results

Primary

Candidates 
 Tim Bridgewater, businessman
 Mike Lee, attorney

Endorsements 
Bridgewater

Lee

Polling

Results

Democratic nomination

Candidates 
 Sam Granato, businessman
 Christopher Stout, accountant

Results

General election

Candidates 
 Scott Bradley (C), businessman
 Sam Granato (D), businessman
 Mike Lee (R), attorney

Campaign 
Granato emphasized his opposition to nuclear weapon tests in neighboring Nevada. In addition, he criticized Lee for his support of raising the retirement age and for questioning the constitutionality of Social Security.

Predictions

Polling

Fundraising

Results

References

External links 
 Utah Government Services - Elections
 U.S. Congress candidates for Utah at Project Vote Smart
 Utah U.S. Senate 2010 from OurCampaigns.com
 Campaign contributions from Open Secrets

 Election 2010: Utah Senate from Rasmussen Reports
 Utah Senate - Lee vs. Granato from Real Clear Politics
 2010 Utah Senate Race from CQ Politics
 Race profile from The New York Times
Debates
 Utah Senate Republican Primary Debate, C-SPAN, June 2, 2010
 Utah Senate Debate, C-SPAN, September 16, 2010
Official campaign sites (Archived)
 Scott Bradley for U.S. Senate
 Mike Lee for U.S. Senate
 Sam Granato for U.S. Senate

2010 Utah elections
Utah
2010